The 820th Base Defense Group is the United States Air Force's only first-in, fully-integrated, world-wide deployable, base defense capability currently based at Moody Air Force Base, Georgia.  The BDG (approximately 800 personnel) was activated in 1997 and is composed of three rapidly-deployable Base Defense Squadrons (822 BDS "Safeside", 823 BDS "Jesters", 824 BDS "Ghostwalkers"), and the 820th Combat Operations Squadron (820 COS "Reapers"). Each multi-functional BDS contains security forces, intelligence, EOD, engineering, communications, medical, logistics, and administration personnel able to operate with limited support from other deployed forces, as part of the Department of Defense's Immediate Response Force (IRF). The unit is trained and equipped to perform airborne insertion, air assault operations, airfield security assessments, base defense, mounted/dismounted patrolling, and C2 of defense forces for one large base or several small sites. Additionally, the squadrons can link with other integrated defense or initial entry/base seizure forces and provide a secure and smooth transition to airfield opening forces.

History
The Group traces its lineage to the 1041st USAF Security Police Squadron (Test) formed at Schofield Barracks, Hawaii, designated by the code name "Operation SAFESIDE".

Well planned attacks by organized guerilla raiding parties on three of the major air bases in Vietnam forced the USAF to redirect its attention from internal security to providing a well trained and well armed, highly motivated combat security police force capable of repelling raids by experienced enemy sapper units.

A security survey was conducted by the USAF Inspector General in the Republic of Vietnam in 1965 and presented to the Chief of Staff, USAF with the recommendation that a test unit of highly trained Combat Security Police be formed to initiate a new concept, known as "Active Defense."

The development of tactics to support an active defense program would require knowledge of infantry tactics not common to normal security police operations, and after careful consideration, the U.S. Army Ranger School at Fort Benning, Georgia was selected as the training course for the original cadre of the test unit. Personnel selected through personal interview were sent to Fort Benning and began the first Ranger School class to include USAF personnel on 4 May 1966.

On 13 January 1967 the 1041st USAF SPS (T) arrived at Phu Cat Air Base, an essentially bare base operation in the Central Highlands of Vietnam whose runway was still under construction.  During the period 13 Jan to 4 Jul 1967, the 1041st secured its Tactical Area of Responsibility (TAOR) of 9.3 square miles of jungle and rice paddies with active defense tactics developed during its training phase at Schofield Barracks. These tactics included daylight recon patrols, forward observation posts during the day and listening posts at night, operation of tactical motor patrols with gun jeeps, sweep and clear operations, relocation of areas of population, and the use of the primary tactic in active defense operations: The ambush patrol.

This resulted in the acceptance of active defense tactics and the Combat Security Police program received official approval from the Chief of Staff and Secretary of the Air Force on 1 July 1968 and established the 82nd Combat Security Police Wing, active from 1968 at Fairchild Air Force Base, Washington, and then Fort Campbell, Kentucky, until its inactivation in 1983.

The unit remained inactive from 1983 until the attacks on Khobar Towers in 1996 would again highlight the Air Force's need for a specialized force protection unit.

The Base Defense Group today 
Following the Khobar Towers bombing, the unit was reestablished and redesignated as the 820th Security Forces Group (820 SFG) at Lackland AFB, Texas.  In the beginning, the 820 SFG consisted of a headquarters element under the Air Force Security Forces Center there, with seven flights scattered around the country; one each at Eglin AFB, Florida; El Paso Air National Guard Base, Texas; Lackland AFB, Texas; Davis-Monthan AFB, Arizona; McGuire AFB, New Jersey; Westover Air Reserve Base, Massachusetts; and Vandenberg AFB, California. These flights came together to form a squadron when the headquarters teams deployed for contingencies.  In addition to Security Forces, the unit also had personnel from the Office of Special Investigations, civil engineering, logistics and supply, communications, intelligence, administration, personnel, and the medical career fields, establishing the first multi-functional air base defense force in the Air Force.  From March 1997, the group and its seven geographically separated flights trained and became operational.

On 1 August 1999, Detachment 1, 820 SFG activated at Moody AFB, Georgia to plan and execute relocation from Lackland AFB and to constitute three new Security Forces Squadrons. On 14 March 2001, the official activation of the new Group occurred at Moody AFB under Air Combat Command (ACC) as a direct reporting unit.  On 18 August 2006, it was assigned to the 347th Rescue Wing. On 31 October 2006, it 

was reassigned to the 23rd Wing where it remained until 25 January 2008. On that date, it was reassigned to the newly formed 93rd Air Ground Operations Wing.

Since its re-activation in 1997, the 820 BDG has deployed to Bahrain, Kuwait, Qatar, Djibouti, Albania, Uzbekistan, Pakistan, Kyrgyzstan, Afghanistan, Iraq, Jordan, Oman, Turkey, Saudi Arabia, Niger, and Kenya in support of Operations Desert Thunder, Desert Fox, Southern Watch, Shining Hope, Enduring Freedom, Iraqi Freedom, Inherent Resolve, Resolute Support, Freedom's Sentinel, Juniper Shield, and Spartan Shield.

Notably, in January 2005, the then-823 SFS formed the core of Task Force 1041 to lead Operation DESERT SAFESIDE; an aggressive 60-day combat operation to kill or capture insurgents attacking Balad Air Base, Iraq.  TF-1041's designated area of operations was one of the most violent areas in the region, roughly 10 kilometers wide and 6 deep, from the Balad perimeter fence to the Tigris River.  In just 60 days, they captured 17 high value targets, eight major weapons caches, 98 other insurgents, and reduced enemy attacks from their area of operations to nearly zero; and although TF-1041 endured numerous firefights, improvised explosive devices, and indirect fire attacks, they sustained no injuries. Operation DESERT SAFESIDE was by all accounts an overwhelming success; however, it had a larger effect than its immediate impact on the areas around Balad AB. TF-1041 demonstrated that Air Force Security Forces are an exceptionally capable ground combat force in the transformation from a Cold War industrial security force to a relevant ground combat force for the joint warfight in the 21st Century.

In May 2007, the then-820 SFG would constitute the core of the 887th Expeditionary Security Forces Squadron (887 ESFS) at Camp Bucca, Iraq.  The 887 ESFS provided counterinsurgency, detainee operations, and intelligence, surveillance and reconnaissance (ISR) support by conducting area security and mobility support within the Forward Operating Base's joint security area.  During that time, the squadron conducted more than 6,500 outside-the-wire patrols, covering more than 100,000 miles of roads as well as 1,500 Raven-B and 200 Scan Eagle ISR flight operations.  Squadron members endured 40 improvised explosive device detonations, cleared another 16 IEDs, and withstood multiple small-arms attacks.  Over the course of two years, Airmen of the 887th ESFS were awarded the Army shoulder sleeve insignia from the 16th and 42d Military Police Brigades and the 45th, 50th and 32nd Infantry Brigade Combat Teams.  During its inactivation ceremony in 2009, Army Lt Col Bradley Anderson, the 2nd Battalion, 127th Infantry Regiment commander stated, "It's been a great experience having 887th as part of the team.  One might expect that different services might experience a certain amount of friction when tasked and organized together, but this experience has disproven that theory. In fact, the integration of our units was so seamless the Air Force should issue you all crossed rifles and change your name to expeditionary infantry squadron."

The 820 BDG would again deploy to lead outside-the-wire patrol operations at Bagram AB, Afghanistan, constituting the 755th Expeditionary Security Forces Squadron (755 ESFS "Reapers") as part of Combined Joint Task Force 455 (CJTF-455). Partnered with the U.S. Army, Afghan National Security Forces, and coalition partners, CJTF-455 was the only Airman-led battlespace owner in Afghanistan and was responsible for conducting area security operations throughout the 220 square mile base security zone.  The National Geographic documentary series "Inside Combat Rescue" would follow CJTF-455's hunt for Subhanullah, an insurgent group operating around Bagram Airfield responsible for rockets fired onto the main U.S. operating base and trafficking of weapons used against U.S. and Afghan forces. Overall, CJTF-455 achieved the removal of 83 high value individuals and 30 other insurgents from the battlefield during the 2012 and 2013 fighting seasons and reduced mortar and rocket attacks on the airfield.

The group has also deployed to support humanitarian assistance and disaster relief operations in 2005 to New Orleans after Hurricane Katrina, to Port-au-Prince, Haiti, in response to the 2010 Haiti earthquake, to resecure and reestablish Tyndall AFB following hurricane Michael in 2018, and to support Operation ALLIES WELCOME and enhance security for a Afghan evacuation center at Holloman AFB in 2021.

In August 2009, it was announced that Airmen from the New York Air National Guard's 105th Security Forces Squadron from Stewart Air National Guard Base would support the 820 BDG with manpower for their deployments.  Since then, Airmen from the 105 BDS have integrated with the 820 BDG for training and deployments.

The 820th Security Forces Group (820 SFG) was redesignated the 820th Base Defense Group (820 BDG) in October 2010, becoming the only units in the U.S. Air Force designated as "Base Defense" Group and Squadrons.  The "SAFESIDE" Tab is the unofficial symbol of the 820 BDG and symbolizes the unit's lineage from the 1041st Security Police Squadron (Test), code named Operation SAFESIDE, and its history as the first Ranger qualified Airmen in the U.S. Air Force.  In 2007, the then-823 SFS adopted "Jesters" as their unit's moniker and subsequently adapted the SAFESIDE Tab to the "JESTERS" Tab as their unofficial symbol.

Some veterans, current troops, and family members of the 820 BDG maintain the Safeside Association. The volunteers maintain the history of the unit, provide periodic newsletters, and organize an annual Safeside reunion at Moody Air Force Base.

Training and Exercises 

The 820 BDG rotates each of its three Base Defense Squadrons through six-month periods: Reconstitution/Training, Certification/Stand-By, and Immediate Response Force (IRF) Alert.  To do so, each squadron operates independently and every functional specialty within the BDS work, train, and deploy together for the duration of their time at the squadron.  The 820 COS provides the enduring support, training, equipping, and program management to ensure the mobility readiness of the three Base Defense Squadrons.

In the training phase, personnel maintain the individual requirements for both professional military development and functional training for their core Air Force specialty.  This includes weapons qualifications on the various small arms and light weapons employed by the 820 BDG that are typically conducted at the Camp Blanding Joint Training Center in Florida over the course of a week and include ranges for M24, M110, M82A1, M249, M240, M2, Mk19, M320, AT4, M18 Claymore, and the M67 Fragmentation Grenade. Other recurring small arms training for M4 and M9/M18 pistol is conducted at Moody AFB.

Due to its unique mission, various joint schools are available to the Group's personnel that are not typically afforded other Air Force units and include: Ranger, Airborne, Jumpmaster, Pathfinder, Air Assault, Rappel Master, FRIES/SPIES Master, Close Precision Engagement Course (CPEC), Army Sniper, Special Reaction Team, Raven B and Puma sUAS Operator, Air Advisor, Jungle/Mountain/Arctic Warfare, and EMT.  This training provides the initial joint skill qualifications needed to enable the 820 BDG's first-in, world-wide deployable mission and ensures integration and interoperability with the Joint Force.

In the certification phase, a Base Defense Squadron will conduct a Mission Readiness Exercise (MRX) to validate the unit's readiness, collective training, and capability to execute its mission essential tasks. While these evaluations have historically focused on defense of a Forward Operating Base in a Global War on Terrorism setting, in 2019, the 820 BDG shifted the focus to defending distributed operations and adaptive basing, or Agile Combat Employment.  

Other notable exercise include:

Exercise BRIGHT STAR '97, '02, and '07: The then-820 SFG participated in an Egyptian government and U.S. Central Command exercise held in Egypt. The exercise involved thousands of troops from 13 countries including; France, Britain, Greece, Germany, Italy, the Netherlands, Jordan and Kuwait.  In 2007, 820 SFG Airmen participated as part of the Airborne Task Force, conducting an airborne insertion into Egypt.

Operation SOUTHERN PARTNER '09: The then-820 SFG provided base defense and force protection specialists for subject matter exchanges with partner nation air forces in seven Caribbean and Latin American nations across the U.S. Southern Command area of focus.

In 2014, the 820 BDG began participating in an annual trilateral force protection event, Exercise GLOBAL EAGLE.  This exercise incorporates collective training of the 820 BDG, UK's Royal Air Force Regiment, and France's Commando Parachutiste De l'Air and culminates with a combined field training exercise (FTX) and airborne operation.

Exercise COPE NORTH '17: The 820 BDG participated in a multi-lateral base defense exercise in Guam with the Royal Australian Air Force, Japan Air Self-Defense Force, and other Air Forces Pacific units to counter a scenario involving militia training local villagers to conduct guerilla attacks, mortar strikes, and improvised explosive devices.  This was the 820 BDG's first exercise to test their ability to operate in a jungle environment.

Exercise MOBILITY GUARDIAN '19:  An advance element of the 820 BDG conducted a Joint Forcible Entry/Airfield Seizure with 1st Brigade/82nd Airborne Division in the northwest USA to enable the follow-on forces and security of the established airfield.  This adaptive basing scenario was the largest ever conducted by Air Mobility Command.

Exercise MOSAIC TIGER 21-1: An airborne section of the 820 BDG seized and secured and airfield with USAF Special Tactics Airmen from Ft Bragg, North Carolina enabling the delivery of follow-on forces to establish basing for forward air support and personnel recovery assets from 23d Wing.  Mosaic Tiger 21-1 was a culmination of nearly two years of planning to prove the skills of the MCA as part of the Air Force’s Agile Combat Employment concept to provide more well-rounded and proficient Airmen.

Red Flag-Nellis 22-1: The 820 BDG participated as a ground element in the Nevada Test and Training Range marking the first integration of the ground defense element to Red Flag.

Exercise TROJAN FOOTPRINT '22: The 820 BDG participated in Special Operations Command Europe's most significant exercise of the year and the largest Special Operations Forces (SOF) exercise in Europe to date.  While not SOF, the 820 BDG participated in multiple missions led by the Special Operations Task Unit, including joint forcible entry training, during which the 820 BDG supplied their Military Working Dog Teams, communication assets, and support by fire.  The 820 BDG has also participated in other exercises within the Special Operations community.

Lineage
1041st Security Police Squadron (Test), inactivated 1 July 1968.
Established and activated as 82d Combat Security Police Wing, 5 March 1968, and later inactivated on 31 December 1969 and disestablished on 15 June 1983.
Reestablished and redesignated as 820th Security Forces Group, 17 March 1997.
Redesignated as 820th Base Defense Group, 30 September 2010.

Assignments 
Tactical Air Command, 8 March 1968 – 15 August 1969
Ninth Air Force, 15 August – 31 December 1969
Air Force Security Forces Center, 17 March 1997 – 14 March 2001
Ninth Air Force, 14 March 2001 – 18 August 2006
347th Rescue Wing, 18 August 2006 – 1 October 2006
23rd Wing, 1 October 2006 – 25 January 2008
93rd Air Ground Operations Wing, 25 January 2008 – Present

Stations 
Fairchild AFB, WA, 8 March 1968 – 15 August 1968.
Fort Campbell, KY, 15 August 1968 – 31 December 1969.
Lackland AFB, TX, 17 March 1997 – 14 March 2001
Moody AFB, GA, 14 March 2001 – Present

Unit awards

References

External links

 Fact Sheet

820
Security units of the United States Air Force